The Poetry Foundation is an American literary society that  seeks to promote poetry and lyricism in the wider culture. It was formed from Poetry magazine, which it continues to publish, with a 2003 gift of $200 million from philanthropist Ruth Lilly.

According to the foundation's website, it is "committed to a vigorous presence for poetry in our culture. It exists to discover and celebrate the best poetry and to place it before the largest possible audience." In partial furtherance of this objective, the foundation runs a blog called Harriet. Poets who have blogged at Harriet on behalf of The Poetry Foundation include Christian Bök, Stephanie Burt, Wanda Coleman, Kwame Dawes, Linh Dinh, Camille Dungy, Annie Finch, Forrest Gander, Rigoberto González, Cathy Park Hong, Bhanu Kapil, Ange Mlinko, Eileen Myles, Craig Santos Perez, A.E. Stallings, Edwin Torres, and Patricia Smith. In addition, the foundation provides several awards for poets and poetry. It also hosts seminars, readings, exhibitions, and a poetry library.

The Poetry Foundation is a non-profit, charitable, 501(c)(3) organization.

History
The foundation is the successor to the Modern Poetry Association (previous publisher of Poetry magazine), which was founded in 1941. The magazine, itself,  was established in 1912 by Harriet Monroe. Monroe was its first publisher until her death in 1936. Today, the Poetry Foundation is one of the largest literary foundations in the world.

In 2003, Poetry magazine received a grant from the estate of Ruth Lilly originally said to be worth over $100 million, but which grew to be about $200 million when it was given out. The grant added to her already substantial prior contributions.

The magazine learned in 2001 that it would be getting the grant. Before announcing the gift, the magazine waited a year and reconfigured its governing board, which had been concerned with fund-raising. The foundation was created, and Joseph Parisi, who had been editor of the magazine for two decades, volunteered to head the new organization. Christian Wiman, a young critic and poet, succeeded to the editorship in 2003. Parisi resigned from the foundation after a few months.

The new board used a recruiting agency to find John Barr, a former executive and published poet, to head the foundation. Robert Polito, the poet and critic who founded and directed the graduate writing program at the New School, succeeded Barr in 2013 and served until 2015. In December, 2015, Henry S. Bienen, President Emeritus of Northwestern University was named president. Bienen served as the president of The Poetry Foundation from December 2015 until his resignation on June 10, 2020, following criticism of the foundation's support for marginalized artists. In April 2021, the foundation named former city of Chicago cultural commissioner Michelle T. Boone as its new president.

Poetry Foundation building
Part of the Lilly grant was used to build the Poetry Center in Near North Side, Chicago.  The center, designed by John Ronan, opened in 2011.  The center holds a library open to the public, houses reading spaces, hosts school and tour groups, and provides office and editorial space for the Poetry Foundation and magazine.

Programs

Events
The Poetry Foundation hosts a schedule of events.  These include poetry readings, staged plays, artist collaborations, and exhibitions.

Harriet Monroe Poetry Institute
The Harriet Monroe Poetry Institute provides an independent forum to convene discussions about poetry.  Poets, scholars, educators and others are invited to share ideas about the intellectual and practical needs of the poetry form, and to generate solutions to benefit the art.

Poetry Out Loud contest
The Poetry Out Loud recitation contest was created in 2006 by the Poetry Foundation and the National Endowment for the Arts  to increase awareness of poetry through performance and competition. It engages high school students in public speaking and the literature and performance of poetry.  The contest gives out a $20,000 award to the first-place winner, $10,000 for second place and $5,000 for third place. Participating schools also receive cash prizes.

Awards

The foundation's awards seek to promote and bring recognition to poets and poetry.  The Pegasus Awards are a series of awards to "under-recognized" poets and poetic forms (the winged horse, Pegasus, was used to illustrate the early magazine covers).  They are generally given annually but may be given less often. The Young People's Poet Laureate (formerly the Children's Poet Laureate) is a two-year appointment to an author of children's poetry. The Ruth Lilly Prize is an annual award given for lifetime achievement in poetry to U.S. poets. The Ruth Lilly Poetry Fellowship is awarded to aspiring U.S. poets to support study and writing. The Emily Dickinson First Book Award is an occasional award that recognizes an American poet, not under the age of 40, who has not yet published a poetry collection in book form; Kristen Tracy won the 2017 award, consisting of $10,000 and publication and promotion of her collection Half-Hazard by Graywolf Press.

Library
The 30,000-volume library presents a wide selection of modern and contemporary poetry in English or translation. It includes original author works and rare volumes. It also includes representative samples of earlier eras, and includes a 3000-volume children's section.  In addition to the reading room, there are listening booths for poet audio recordings and broadcasts related to poetry and interactive displays.  It is open to the public Tuesday through Friday with a children's day on Wednesday.

See also
List of museums and cultural institutions in Chicago

Notes

External links

 First Foundation president (2003—2013) John Barr's annual letters to the poetry community

American poetry
Arts foundations based in the United States
Organizations based in Chicago
Libraries in Chicago
Poetry organizations
Library buildings completed in 2011
PEN Oakland/Josephine Miles Literary Award winners